Stanton Lewis refers to:

Stanton Lewis (footballer born 1974), Bermudian footballer
Stanton Lewis (footballer born 1987), South African footballer